The Joint  European Disruptive Initiative (JEDI) is a European funding agency aiming at promoting disruptive technologies. Inspired by the US DARPA, it funds innovation in different "missions" (environment and energy, healthcare, education, digital, space, and oceans), with the goal of bringing "Europe in a leadership position in breakthrough technologies". It organizes scientific competitions focused on disruptive technologies. In June 2020, the Joint European Disruptive Initiative was present in 25 countries, with 3.700 persons involved.

Research on Covid-19 
The Joint European Disruptive Initiative launched its first "Darpa-type GrandChallenge" on Covid-19 on May 5th, 2020. The competition consisted in screening "billions of molecules with blocking interactions on SARS-CoV-2" to develop a drug against the coronavirus — with each participant having to use at least three different calculation methods for the simulations. The foundation claims to have had approximately 54 billions of molecules screened  and 878 of them being synthesized. A paper published in Nature showed that the protein PDB 6W9C was one of the most used in silico drug design against Covid-19.

References 

Research councils
Science and technology in Europe
Grants (money)
Life sciences industry
Research projects